Nicaragua will participate in the 2011 Parapan American Games.

Athletics

Nicaragua will send four male athletes to compete.

Goalball

Nicaragua will send one team of six athletes to compete in the men's tournament.

Powerlifting

Nicaragua will send one male athlete to compete.

Nations at the 2011 Parapan American Games
2011 in Nicaraguan sport
Nicaragua at the Pan American Games